Jason Lazare Mbock (born 1 November 1999) is a French professional footballer who plays as a winger for Ligue 1 club Angers.

Career
Mbock is a youth product of Creteil, INF Clairefontaine, and Monaco. He began his senior career with the reserves of Monaco in 2017, before moving to the reserves of Angers in 2019. He signed his first professional contract with Angers on 14 August 2020. He went on loan to the Swiss Challenge League club Neuchâtel Xamax for the 2020–21 season. He made his professional debut with Angers in a 1–0 Ligue 1 loss to Saint-Étienne on 26 January 2022.

Personal life
Born in France, Mbock is of Cameroonian descent.

References

External links
 

1999 births
Living people
Sportspeople from Créteil
French sportspeople of Cameroonian descent
French footballers
Footballers from Val-de-Marne
Association football wingers
Angers SCO players
Neuchâtel Xamax FCS players
Ligue 1 players
Swiss Challenge League players
Championnat National 2 players
French expatriate footballers
French expatriate sportspeople in Monaco
Expatriate footballers in Monaco
French expatriate sportspeople in Switzerland
Expatriate footballers in Switzerland